Queen's House is a former royal residence built between 1616 and 1635 in Greenwich, England.

Queen's House may also refer to:

Buildings
 Buckingham Palace, London, England, known as Queen's House in the time of Queen Charlotte 
 Queen's House, Colombo, Sri Lanka, now called President's House
 Queen's House, Jaffna, Sri Lanka
 Queen's House, at Hameau de la Reine, Versailles, France

Other uses
 Queen's House Football Club, a 19th-century rugby club in Greenwich

See also
 
 King's House (disambiguation)
 Queen's Castle, Seneca County, New York.
 List of royal palaces
 :Category:Royal residences